Fix is the first EP by American country music singer Chris Lane. It was released on November 13, 2015 by Big Loud Records. The album was produced by Joey Moi, who has worked with fellow country music artists Florida Georgia Line and Dallas Smith. The EP's lead single "Fix" was released two weeks prior to the EP's digital release, and reached to number 21 on Billboard Hot Country Songs chart. On April 15, 2016, the album saw a physical releases exclusively on Target, which included two bonus tracks.

Commercial performance
The album debuted at No. 46 on the Top Country Albums chart, selling 1,100 copies in the first week.  It peaked at No. 23 on the chart in May the following year. It has sold 15,000 copies in the United States as of July 2016.

Track listing

Chart performance

References 

2015 debut EPs
Chris Lane EPs
Albums produced by Joey Moi
Big Loud albums